Longdu is a town of Chenghai District, in the northern suburbs of Shantou, in eastern Guangdong province, China.

References

Township-level divisions of Guangdong